Secret Agent 077 is a fictional superspy, lead character in a trilogy of Eurospy films starring Ken Clark as Dick Malloy (or Maloy). However "077" was used on posters or advertising of several other Eurospy films with little or no relationship to each other perhaps to exploit the audience's knowledge of 007.

Official entries
The first two were directed by Sergio Grieco under the pseudonym Terence Hathaway, the third directed by Alberto De Martino, with all starring Ken Clark. All were Italian/French and Spanish co-productions shot around the world in Technicolor and Techniscope:

 Agent 077: Mission Bloody Mary (1965)
 Agent 077: From the Orient with Fury (1965)
 Special Mission Lady Chaplin (1966) (directed by Alberto De Martino)

In 1967 the same production company produced The Tiffany Memorandum directed by Grieco but starring Clark as "Dick Hallam" a journalist drawn into the CIA.

Other films
Brett Halsey played an Agent 077 with the name of George Farrell in Espionage in Lisbon whilst Luis Dávila played Agent S.077 with the name of "Marc Mato" or "Mike Murphy" in Espionage in Tangier.

Richard Harrison's Bob Fleming in Secret Agent Fireball and Killers Are Challenged was titled Agent 077 in some countries.

A 1968 Indian film was titled Golden Eyes Secret Agent 077.

Notes

Italian film series
Italian spy thriller films
Film characters introduced in 1965
Fictional secret agents and spies in films
Male characters in film
Italian adventure films
Parody films based on James Bond films